Lorraine Green Mazerolle (born 1964) is an Australian criminologist and professor at the School of Social Science at the University of Queensland, where she is also an affiliate professor at the Institute for Social Science Research. She is also a chief investigator in the Australian Research Council's Centre of Excellence for Children and Families over the Life Course, as well as a former Australian Research Council Laureate Fellow. She is the editor-in-chief of the Journal of Experimental Criminology. She is also a fellow of the Academy of the Social Sciences in Australia and the Academy of Experimental Criminology. She served as president of the Academy of Experimental Criminology. Her research interests include problem-oriented policing, civil remedies, and third-party policing.

Education and career
Mazerolle received her Ph.D. from Rutgers University, and taught at the University of Cincinnati and Griffith University before joining the University of Queensland.

Awards and honors
She was awarded an Australian Laureate Fellowship in 2010.

References

External links
Mazerolle's faculty page

Mazerolle's profile at the UQ Researchers website

Living people
1964 births
Rutgers University alumni
Academic staff of the University of Queensland
Academic journal editors
Australian women editors
Australian criminologists
Australian women academics
University of Cincinnati faculty
Academic staff of Griffith University
Fellows of the Academy of the Social Sciences in Australia
Australian women criminologists